The Hôtel De Brouckère is an Art Nouveau town house designed and built in 1898 by the architect Octave van Rysselberghe, in collaboration with Henry van de Velde. It is located at 34, / in Brussels, Belgium.

Location
The Hôtel De Brouckère is located in Brussels, at 34, /, at the corner of the /, and a few steps from the Avenue Louise/Louizalaan.

History 
The Hôtel de Brouckère was built in 1898 for Florence De Brouckère, born Florence Tant, widow since 1887 of Gustave De Brouckère, mother-in-law of Louis de Brouckère, and friend of Élisée Reclus. It was in fact Élisée Reclus who was the true promoter of this construction and who put her companion in contact with Henry van de Velde and the creative world of the time.

It was classified as a protected monument in 1997 and currently houses the Representation of the German-speaking Community.

Architecture

Material
The Hôtel De Brouckère was built in freestone of golden color, with the exception of the basement which is made of blue stone.

The facades
The building is sober in style, and it does not have the same profusion of volumes as the nearby Hotel Otlet. It has a short facade overlooking the Rue De Crayer and a long facade facing the Rue Jordaens, the two facades being connected by a canted side.

The bays on the ground floor are surmounted by low arches with an elegant design, while the first floor, underlined by a marked cordon, is pierced by a series of windows with a slightly recessed rectangular frame and surmounted by five keystones. The windows located at the ends of the floor are in triplet.

The facades are crowned by a cornice supported by an elegant freestone frieze punctuated by slender brackets also made of freestone.

The court
The building is extended by a courtyard delimited by an enclosure wall clinging to the main facade with an elegant curve.

The side facade overlooking this courtyard presents an alternation of white stone and red brick.

See also
 Art Nouveau in Brussels
 History of Brussels
 Belgium in "the long nineteenth century"

References

Notes

External links

Houses in Belgium
City of Brussels
Art Nouveau architecture in Brussels
Art Nouveau houses
Octave van Rysselberghe buildings
Houses completed in 1898